Heads is the third album by British Afro rock band Osibisa released in 1972.

Track listing

Charts

Personnel
 Teddy Osei – tenor saxophone, flute, African drums, vocals
 Sol Amarfio – African drums, bells, bongos, cowbells, drums, percussion, vocals
 Mac Tontoh – trumpet, flugelhorn, cornet, kabasa, percussion, vocals 
 Spartacus R (Roy Bedeau) – bass guitar, percussion
 Wendell Richardson – lead guitar, acoustic guitar, lead vocals
 Robert Bailey – congas, flute, acoustic guitar, Moog bass, organ, piano, electric piano, clavinet, timbales, percussion, vocals
 Loughty Lasisi Amao – tenor saxophone, baritone saxophone, flute, congas
 Robert Bailey, Jr. – bass, acoustic guitar, Moog synthesizer, organ, piano, electric piano, timbales, vocals

Production
 Producer – Osibisa and John Punter
 Engineer – John Punter
 Cover painting – Abdul Mati Klarwein
 Cover design – David Howells
 Osibisa logo – Roger Dean
 Photography – Shepard Sherbell
 Remastering – Andrew Thompson
 Liner notes – Alan Robinson

References

 All information from liner notes of CD Heads (Copyright © 1972 MCA Records).
 Allmusic

Exyternal Links
 

1972 albums
Osibisa albums
Albums produced by John Punter
Albums with cover art by Mati Klarwein
MCA Records albums